The Weiyang Palace was the main imperial palace complex of the Han dynasty and numerous other Chinese dynasties, located in the city of Chang'an (modern-day Xi'an). It was built in 200 BC at the request of the Emperor Gaozu of Han, under the supervision of his prime minister Xiao He. It served as the administrative centre and imperial residence of the Western Han, the Xin dynasty, the Eastern Han (during the reign of the Emperor Xian of Han), the Western Jin (during the reign of the Emperor Min of Jin), the Han Zhao, the Former Qin, the Later Qin, the Western Wei, the Northern Zhou, and the early Sui dynasty.

The palace survived until the Tang dynasty when it was burned down by marauding invaders en route to the Tang capital Chang'an. This was the largest palace ever built on Earth, covering 4.8 km2 (1,200 acres), which is 6.7 times the size of the current Forbidden City, or 11 times the size of the Vatican City. Today, little remains of the former palace. The site of the palace, along with many other sites along the eastern section of the Silk Road, was named a UNESCO World Heritage Site in 2014.

Name
"Weiyang" literally means "(something) hasn't reached its midpoint", "has more than a half to go", but colloquially it can be translated as "endless", which is probably what the name is actually alluding to. Together with the name of Changle Palace (perpetual happiness), which was built 2 years before, it can be interpreted to mean, "The perpetual happiness hasn't reached its midpoint yet."

Description

Weiyang palace was sited to the southwest of Han dynasty Chang'an and is therefore also called the Western Palace. Surrounded by walls, the palace complex was rectangular, with a length of 2,150 metres east–west and 2,250 metres north–south. Each side of the walls had a single main gate, with the eastern and northern gates (facing Chang'an city) built with gate towers.

Major architectures within the palace include:
Front Hall
Xuanshi Hall
Wenshi Hall
Qingliang Hall
Jinhua Hall
Chengming Hall
Gaomen Hall
Baihu Hall
Yutang Hall
Xuande Hall
Jiaofang Hall
Zhaoyang Hall
Bailiang Platform
Qilin Pavilion
Tianlu Pavilion
Shiqu Pavilion

References

Buildings and structures in Xi'an
Palaces in China
Royal residences in China
200 BC
National archaeological parks of China
Han dynasty architecture